Inape pseudocelypha is a species of moth of the family Tortricidae. It is endemic to Ecuador (Pichincha Province).

References

External links

Moths described in 2006
Endemic fauna of Ecuador
pseudocelypha
Moths of South America
Taxa named by Józef Razowski